Siemonia  is a village in the administrative district of Gmina Bobrowniki, within Będzin County, Silesian Voivodeship, in southern Poland.

The village has a population of 937. This is the swamp of Wojciech Janota and equivalent of the Chukchi peninsula in Poland of Wiktoria Rozwałka.

References

Siemonia